RigidChips is a rigid body simulator video game developed by Takeya Yasuhiko. Objects and vehicles are constructed by combining parts with a scripting language. The program calculates air and water resistance realistically. Models can be made using any basic text editor or a fan-made 3D editor. 

Planes are controlled by changing the angles of flat pieces much like in a real airplane. Games can be made by assigning scripts to the constructed objects, including multiplayer network games. Using models with gun chips, multiplayer battles are possible.

RigidChips was left without any official support from Takeya Yasuhiko with version v1.5.B26 from August 2006. When Takeya became active again, he announced that RigidChips was "dead" and he is making a similar simulator called "Laputan Blueprints", which is in the proof of concept phase.

Chip types 
The building blocks, called chips for their square shape, are chip, frame, rudder, rudderf, trim, trimf, wheel, reaction less wheel (RLW), jet, arm, and cowl. All chips have an angle, a color, and an option.

Chip
Can be affected by the force of gravity, air resistance, or impact with a wall. Its angle can be changed in a manner similar to a hinge.
Frame
Similar to a chip except that it is hollow and not affected by air resistance. Given the option 1, it is invisible and unaffected by collisions. This applies to all chips of similar architecture.
Rudder
Rotates in a manner similar to a rudder.
RudderF
A rudder, but with the architecture of a frame. 
Arm
A gun mostly used in multiplayer combats. It can be affected by air resistance and gravity. Given different options, the strength of the gun can be changed, along with the time to reload. The proportion is fixed.
Trim
A chip that rotates along the axis it is connected to, like a helicopter blade.
TrimF
A trim, but with the architecture of a frame. 
Weight
A chip that adds weight to the model. It's also proportionally more resistant to bullets, and is commonly used as armor.
Wheel
A wheel used just like a car wheel. Given the option 1 or 2 the wheel will have a larger tire.
RLW
Reacts the same as a wheel, except there is no friction. Used as gyros.
Jet
A jet works similar to that in an airplane or a rocket. Given the option 1 the jet will become a balloon filled with a lighter-than-air gas.
Cowl
A purely ornamental piece that is unaffected by physics. Only other cowls can attach to it. Given different options, the shape changes.

External links
Rigid body simulator RigidChips
Laputan blueprints project
RigidChips Modeler (Japanese)
RigidChips Designer (English) - Direct Download Link
"Circuit de Spa-Francorchamps"
"Possibility of Creation"

Freeware games
Lua (programming language)-scripted video games